Jane Smit (born 24 December 1972) is an English former cricketer who played as a wicket-keeper and right-handed batter. She appeared in 21 Test matches, 109 One Day Internationals and 4 Twenty20 Internationals for England between 1992 and 2008 and was part of the team which regained the Ashes in 2005. She played domestic cricket for East Midlands from 1989 to 1999 and Nottinghamshire from 2000 to 2017.

In the 2000 Women's Cricket World Cup in New Zealand, Smit and Claire Taylor shared a partnership of 188* against Sri Lanka at Bert Sutcliffe Oval, Lincoln. It remains the highest fifth-wicket partnership in Women's One Day Internationals.

Smit holds the record for most dismissals as wicket-keeper in Women's Cricket World Cup history (40).

Her brother David represented Derbyshire Cricket Board in List A cricket between 1999 and 2002.

References

External links

1972 births
Living people
People from Ilkeston
Cricketers from Derbyshire
England women Test cricketers
England women One Day International cricketers
England women Twenty20 International cricketers
East Midlands women cricketers
Nottinghamshire women cricketers
Wicket-keepers